The Union Railway Car Barn is an historic building in Cambridge, Massachusetts.  It is a large brick -story building, with a distinctive round-arch central window and a stepped brick cornice.  Its ground floor has been converted to a retail storefront.  It was built in 1869 to house the horse-drawn streetcars of the Union Railway Company, founded in 1855.  It is the only surviving car barn of three built by the company in Cambridge, and a rare surviving element of the city's 19th-century transportation infrastructure.

The building was listed on the National Register of Historic Places in 1982.

See also
National Register of Historic Places listings in Cambridge, Massachusetts

References

Railway buildings and structures on the National Register of Historic Places in Massachusetts
Buildings and structures in Cambridge, Massachusetts
National Register of Historic Places in Cambridge, Massachusetts
Transportation in Cambridge, Massachusetts